Robia LaMorte Scott (born 1970) is an American actress and dancer.  She is best known as a dancer and spokesperson for musician Prince, and for starring as Jenny Calendar in the television series Buffy the Vampire Slayer.

Early life
Scott was born in the New York City borough of Queens in 1970 and grew up in several locations including the Florida Keys and Ocean City, Maryland. She is named after her father, Robert LaMorte. After being inspired by the 1983 movie Flashdance, she began dancing and taking after-school lessons in jazz dance, ballet, and tap dance.  She attended the Los Angeles County High School for the Arts as a dance major during the school's first year of operation, and then received a full scholarship to the Dupree Dance Academy in Hollywood. At sixteen, she began working as a backup dancer in music videos, first appearing in Debbie Gibson's "Shake Your Love".

Career
After having appeared in more than thirty music videos and toured in a six-dancer troupe with the Pet Shop Boys, LaMorte was picked by Prince to be one of two lead dancers for the music video for "Cream", a single from his 1991 album Diamonds and Pearls.  Prince had originally sought identical twins, but chose LaMorte along with another dancer, Lori Elle, because of their similar appearance and the dance chemistry they had with him.  Elle as "Diamond" and LaMorte as "Pearl" subsequently appeared in the videos for "Cream", "Gett Off", "Strollin'", and the album's title track, as well as on the album's holographic cover itself.  LaMorte and Elle then toured Europe with Prince, and when he temporarily refused to do any public speaking, the two women served as his spokespersons and conducted the main promotional efforts for Diamonds and Pearls.
Elle would later go on tour with Ricky Martin and Michael Jackson.

At the age of 22, LaMorte retired from dance and turned to acting. After doing numerous television commercials, she landed the role of Jason Priestley's girlfriend Jill Fleming on Beverly Hills, 90210 in two episodes and played the female lead (alongside Andrew Bowen) in the live action video game Fox Hunt. Her first regular role was as high school teacher and technopagan Jenny Calendar on the first two seasons of Buffy the Vampire Slayer.  After her character was killed during the second season, she returned for two more episodes as a ghost. In the second season finale "Becoming, Part Two" she makes a brief appearance as a hypnosis induced suggestion by Drusilla to trick Rupert Giles into revealing the flaw in Angel's plan. Finally she returned during the third season episode "Amends" to play a false apparition of the dead Calendar, a guise assumed by the evil force known as "the First Evil".  However, LaMorte had become a born-again Christian after a highway encounter with a Christian biker gang while she was praying for a sign from God. After having already accepted the guest appearance on her old show, she was upset to learn that she would be playing an equivalent of Satan.

Since her role ended on Buffy, LaMorte has periodically accepted guest starring roles on various television shows.  More recently she has retired from acting, focusing her efforts on other priorities such as Christian counseling, although she occasionally can be seen in commercials and smaller roles.  She also spends some of her time preaching Christianity and selling audio CDs on her website that give accounts of her religious conversion and beliefs.  In an FAQ on that site, LaMorte writes that while she was once a proponent of New Age beliefs, she rejected them after her conversion to Christianity. She criticizes these beliefs as a form of "earth worship" and characterizes the practice of witchcraft a dangerous opening for demonic influence. She later returned to acting, appearing in the film Unplanned.

Personal life
As of 2020, LaMorte is married under the last name Scott. She has one daughter. She is a committed Christian, and describes her conversion on her website.

Filmography

References

External links

Robia LaMorte official site

1970 births
Living people
20th-century American actresses
21st-century American actresses
21st-century Christians
Actresses from Florida
Actresses from Los Angeles
Actresses from Maryland
Actresses from New York City
American evangelicals
American female dancers
American dancers
American film actresses
American television actresses
Christians from California
Christians from Florida
Christians from Maryland
Christians from New York (state)
People from Ocean City, Maryland
People from Queens, New York
Los Angeles County High School for the Arts alumni
Dancers from New York (state)
American Christians